Janet Radcliffe Richards (born 1944) is a British philosopher specialising in bioethics and feminism and Professor of Practical Philosophy at the University of Oxford. She is the author of The Sceptical Feminist (1980), Philosophical Problems of Equality (1995), Human Nature after Darwin (2000), and The Ethics of Transplants (2012).



Biography
Richards was lecturer in Philosophy at the Open University 1979–1999, and Director of the Centre for Bioethics and Philosophy of Medicine at University College London until 2007. Since 2008, she has been Professor of Practical Philosophy at Oxford University.  

She was in a relationship with philosopher Derek Parfit from 1982, and they were married from 2010 until his death in 2017.

Work 
Richards is the author of several books, papers and articles, and has sat on a variety of advisory and working committees in areas of philosophy and bioethics. She is also a Distinguished Research Fellow at the Oxford Uehiro Centre for Practical Ethics and posts regularly at the University of Oxford's Practical Ethics: Ethical Perspectives on the News website.

Her identification with feminism and her focus on bioethics both occurred "by accident" during the writing of her first book, The Sceptical Feminist: A Philosophical Enquiry (Routledge, 1980; Penguin, 1982) – bioethics being central to the abortion debate. The book proved to be controversial within and without feminism, e.g. in regard to standards of rationality, fashion and style, and her liberal stance.

Her second book, Human Nature After Darwin: A Philosophical Introduction (Routledge, 2001) explores the so-called Darwin Wars, including what implications Darwinism raises for philosophy and the application of critical thinking to various arguments put forward in the debate. It was originally written as an introduction to philosophical techniques for Open University students using the controversies relating to Darwinian thinking and human nature.

Richards is a firm believer in effective altruism and is since April 2014 a member of Giving What We Can, a community of people who have pledged to give at least 10% of their income to effective charities.

Bibliography
 The Sceptical Feminist: A Philosophical Enquiry, Routledge, (1980)
 Human Nature After Darwin: A Philosophical Introduction, Routledge, (2001)
 "Why Feminist Epistemology Isn't" (1997) in The Flight from Science and Reason P. Gross, N. Levitt & M. Lewis; Johns Hopkins University Press.
 "Organs For Sale", Janet Radcliffe Richards, Issues Med Ethics. 2001 April–June;9(2)

References

External Links 

 Faculty page at Oxford University
Reason and romance: The world’s most cerebral marriage

1944 births
20th-century British philosophers
21st-century British philosophers
Academics of University College London
Bioethicists
British women philosophers
Feminist philosophers
Living people